Afrothismia winkleri is a species of plant in the Burmanniaceae family. It is found in Cameroon, Nigeria, and possibly Uganda. Its natural habitat is subtropical or tropical moist lowland forests. It is threatened by habitat loss.

References

Sources

Burmanniaceae
Critically endangered plants
Taxonomy articles created by Polbot